Loopers is a Japanese science fiction visual novel developed by Key, a brand of Visual Arts. It was released on May 28, 2021 for Windows and is Key's 15th game overall. It was ported to iOS and Android devices, as well as the Nintendo Switch and PlayStation 4. The story follows high school student Tyler and his friends who get caught in a time loop, continuously repeating the same day seemingly without end. Before long, they meet others caught in the same predicament who call themselves "loopers", and the two groups join forces to try to break out of the loop.

Loopers is the third of Key's "kinetic novels"—after Planetarian: The Reverie of a Little Planet (2004) and Harmonia (2016)—since its gameplay offers no choices or alternate endings. Instead, the player proceeds through the story solely by reading. The story was written by Ryukishi07 of 07th Expansion, and character design was produced by Kei Mochizuki. The game's soundtrack was composed by Shinji Orito, Sōshi Hosoi, Donmaru, Hisashi Tenkyū, Shōyu and Sumi.

Development and release
Following Key's previous success with the production of two prior visual novels termed "kinetic novels"—Planetarian: The Reverie of a Little Planet (2004) and Harmonia (2016)—since their gameplay offers no choices or alternate endings, Loopers was one of three kinetic novels announced in October 2020 alongside Lunaria: Virtualized Moonchild (2021) and Stella of The End (2022). Planning for the project began with video game director Kazuma Takada and producer Tōya Okano, the latter of whom has been credited on the staff of Key's visual novels since providing scenario assistance with Air (2000). The game's motif was built around the concept of treasure hunting, specifically geocaching. During a production meeting, Okano suggested the idea of a geochache containing a human finger, adding an element of horror to the story. In keeping with Key's main theme of making the end user cry, the concept for Loopers was solidified around "treasure hunting, horror and crying", to which Takada suggested Ryukishi07 of 07th Expansion be brought in to write the scenario. Ryukishi07 had previously worked with Key on the scenario for Rewrite (2011) and its fan disc Rewrite Harvest festa! (2012) because of his reputation as a horror writer.

Ryukishi07 used his experience as a horror writer, along with his recognition as an author who uses time loops in his stories, to repeat the same day in the story at given intervals as the plot progresses. As he had plenty of time for the development of the game's plot, he was able to carefully write it while continuing to discuss it with the production staff over the course of its development. In contrast to his work on Rewrite, which he views as having been written with a certain youthful vigor, he sees Loopers as a culmination of everything he has cultivated as a writer, making it his most carefully written story to date by his own admission. In keeping with Key's brand image, Ryukishi07 restrained from making the story too horrific, opting to give it a mysterious feel with a story that is 70% tear-inducing and 30% horrific, as well as making it suitable for all ages. However, some of his suggestions for horrific elements were rejected by the production staff as not being compatible with Key's image.

Ryukishi07 had not initially been familiar with geocaching when brought onto the project, and he even tried it himself with a geocaching app to get a feel for the treasure hunting process. In researching geocaching, he did not want to sully what is what he refers to as a "fun treasure hunting game," leaving out anything too extreme as a result. Ryukishi07's aim was to write a plot that was a balance between what fans of Key have come to expect from the brand and what he as a writer chosen specifically for the project could bring to add unorthodox elements not normally seen in works produced by Key. He was also attempting to write a story that worked best as a kinetic novel as opposed to a visual novel adventure game. It took him a long time to remain faithful to the story of Loopers while also adjusting its orthodox and unorthodox elements.

Kei Mochizuki is the art director and character designer for Loopers. In production meetings about what art the game would have, there were discussions about how the typical art style Key has used in their games up to now would not be the best fit for a scenario written by Ryukishi07. As a result, Takada suggested to go with Mochizuki because of her distinct art style described as not only stylish, but that which also incorporates moe elements into it to make her character designs both cool and cute according to Ryukishi07. At the time, Takada had been looking forward to what he termed a "large chemical reaction" that would occur from bringing together two creators who have very distinctive styles.

Key released a free game demo on April 26, 2021 on the game's official website. Loopers was released on May 28, 2021 for Windows in Japan. Three editions were released: a download edition just for the game itself, a limited edition, and a more expensive special edition that comes bundled with more content. Both physical editions came bundled with the game's original soundtrack and a full color art book. The special edition was also bundled with an illustrated acrylic plate, a metal key-shaped charm, a Loopers badge, an illustration signed by Kei Mochizuki, and a special card featuring the main characters.

Loopers was also ported to iOS and Android devices in Japan on July 20, 2021. Prototype released a Nintendo Switch port worldwide on June 2, 2022 with text support for Japanese, English and Chinese. Prototype will also release a PlayStation 4 port worldwide on February 16, 2023 with text support for Japanese, English and Chinese.

Music
The game's soundtrack was composed by Shinji Orito, Sōshi Hosoi, Donmaru, Hisashi Tenkyū, Shōyu and Sumi. Each song is sung by Sana of the rock band Sajou no Hana. The Loopers Original Soundtrack was bundled with the limited and special edition releases of the game on May 28, 2021. It was released on Key Sounds Label bearing the catalog number KSLA-0184.

Reception
Loopers premiered as the No. 11 game sold on Getchu.com, a major redistributor of visual novel and domestic anime products, during the month of its release. It later ranked as the No. 8 most sold computer game in Japan in 2021.

References

External links
 

2021 video games
Android (operating system) games
Bishōjo games
IOS games
Key (company) games
Nintendo Switch games
PlayStation 4 games
Science fiction video games
Video games about time loops
Video games developed in Japan
Video games set in Japan
Visual novels
Windows games